On Your Feet or on Your Knees is the first live album by American rock band Blue Öyster Cult, released by Columbia Records on February 27, 1975. The album features three songs from each of the band's first three studio albums, two covers ("I Ain't Got You", albeit with modified lyrics, and "Born to Be Wild"), and one ("Buck's Boogie") original instrumental that remains a staple of the band's live shows to this day. The 12 songs include performances at the Academy of Music in New York City, the Paramount Theatre in Portland, the Paramount Theatre in Seattle, the Show Palace in Phoenix, the Long Beach Arena, the P.N.E. Coliseum in Vancouver and the Capitol Theatre in New Jersey, though it is not clear which songs came from which venues and on what dates. The cover lettering designed by Gerard Huerta, also used on the 2012 boxed set, was one of the first "Heavy Metal" logo designs.

The album reached No. 22 on the Billboard 200, in so doing becoming the band's highest-charting album in the United States.

Track listing

Personnel
Band members
Eric Bloom - lead vocals on tracks 1-2, 4-5, 9, 11-12, stun guitar, synthesizer
Donald "Buck Dharma" Roeser - lead guitar, lead vocals on "Then Came The Last Days of May" and "Before the Kiss (A Redcap)"
Allen Lanier - rhythm guitar, keyboards
Joe Bouchard - bass, lead vocals on "Hot Rails to Hell"
Albert Bouchard - drums, guitar, lead vocals on "Cities on Flame With Rock-And-Roll"

Production
Murray Krugman, Sandy Pearlman - producers
Tom Scott, Kurt Kuntzel, Aaron Baron, Tim Geelan, Pete Weiss, Jerry Smith - engineers
Jack Douglas - engineer, mixing
John Berg and Gerard Huerta - design
John Berg - cover photograph at St. Paul's Chapel, Vista, New York

Charts

Certifications

References

Albums produced by Sandy Pearlman
Blue Öyster Cult live albums
1975 live albums
Columbia Records live albums
Albums produced by Murray Krugman